Cyamops crosbyi is a species of fly. It is found in New Zealand.

References

crosbyi
Diptera of New Zealand
Insects described in 2011